Bruriah ( or , also Beruriah) is one of several women quoted as a sage in the Talmud. She was the wife of the Tanna Rabbi Meir and the daughter of Hananiah ben Teradion.

Biography 
Bruriah lived during the first and second century in Roman-occupied Israel and was the daughter of Rabbi Hananiah ben Teradion, one of the Ten Martyrs, who was burned to death for his faith, as was Bruriah's mother. She had two known siblings, a brother, Simon ben Hananiah, who turned to a life of crime after failing to match Bruriah's success as a teacher, an unnamed sister, who was sold into sexual slavery and later rescued from a Roman brothel by Bruriah's husband, Rabbi Meir.

She is greatly admired for her breadth of knowledge in matters pertaining to both halachah and aggadah, and is said to have learned from the rabbis 300 halachot on a single cloudy day. Her parents were put to death by the Romans for teaching Torah, but she carried on their legacy.

Bruriah was very involved in the halachic discussions of her time, and even challenges her father on a matter of ritual purity. Her comments there are praised by Judah ben Bava. In another instance, Rabbi Joshua praises her intervention in a debate between Rabbi Tarfon and the sages, saying "Bruriah has spoken correctly".

She was also renowned for her sharp wit and often caustic jibes. The Talmud relates that she once chastised Jose the Galilean, when he asked her "By which way do we go to Lod?" claiming that he could have instead said "By which to Lod?" (two Hebrew words rather than four), and thereby kept the Talmudic injunction not to speak to women unnecessarily.

It is told that Bruriah taught her husband, Rabbi Meir, to pray for the repentance of the wicked, rather than for their destruction. According to the story, she once found Rabbi Meir praying that violent men in their neighborhood would die. Appalled by this, she responded to him by pointing out that the verse does not say "Let the sinners be consumed from the earth, and the wicked shall be no more", but rather states: "Let sin be consumed from the earth," with the result that "the wicked shall be no more" because they have repented. Another interpretation of the passage, one that fits with the Masoretic vocalization, suggests that Bruriah explained that the verse does not refer to "those who sin" (as a participle), but habitual "sinners" (as an agent noun).

She is described as having enormous inner strength. The Midrash on the Book of Proverbs tells that her two sons died suddenly on the Sabbath, but she hid the fact from her husband until she could tell him in a way that would comfort him. In response, Rabbi Meir quoted the verse, "A woman of valour, who can find?"

The Bruriah incident
The Talmud mentions that, in the middle of his life, Rabbi Meir fled to Babylonia, and mentions two possible motivations. The second of these is "the Bruriah incident" (מעשה דברוריא), a phrase which is not explained.

Various post-Talmudic commentaries offer explanations of this incident. According to Rashi, Bruriah made light of the Talmudic assertion that women are "light-minded". To vindicate the Talmudic maxim, Rabbi Meir sent one of his students to seduce her. Though she initially resisted the student's advances, she eventually acceded to them. When she realized what she had done, she committed suicide out of shame. (Other sources have it that she fell ill emotionally due to shame, and a group of rabbis prayed for her death and peace.) Rabbi Meir, in turn, exiled himself from Israel out of shame and fled to Babylonia.

This explanation has no recorded source earlier than Rashi, who lived 900 years after the time of Bruriah. It is also surprising in that it attributes serious crimes not only to Bruriah and Rabbi Meir's student (who allegedly committed adultery), but to Rabbi Meir himself (who encouraged them to commit adultery). Traditional rabbis such as Yosef Shalom Elyashiv, as well as academic scholars such as Eitam Henkin, have argued that this story was not written by Rashi, but rather inserted later into his commentary by a mistaken student.

Nissim ben Jacob of Kairouan provides a different explanation that is closer to the text. According to him, Rabbi Meir and Bruriah had to flee to Babylonia after the Roman Empire executed her father, sold her mother into slavery and her sister into sexual slavery at a brothel (to be rescued by Rabbi Meir) and were looking for her. Other rabbinic sources also take issue with Rashi's commentary, and indeed, there exists a tradition among Orthodox rabbis to name their daughters Bruriah, as an assertion of her righteousness.

The commentators explain that she was really able to overcome that test but God punished her for speaking badly of the sages, saying that if she had said the rabbis are correct, but that she was an exception, there would have been no problems. The commentators also posit that there was no actual sin committed because the student was sterile; those that say there was an act of sexual intercourse hold that Rabbi Meir pretended to be his own student.

Legacy 
Several modern Jewish schools for women have been named after Bruriah:
 Midreshet Lindenbaum, originally named Michlelet Bruria
 Bruriah High School for Girls, an all girls yeshiva located in New Jersey

See also 
 Yalta

References 

2nd-century Jews
2nd-century women
Ancient Jewish women
Judaism and women
Talmud people
Talmudic women